311 (three hundred [and] eleven) is the natural number following 310 and preceding 312.

311 is the 64th prime; a twin prime with 313; an irregular prime; an emirp, an Eisenstein prime with no imaginary part and real part of the form ; a Gaussian prime with no imaginary part and real part of the form ; and a permutable prime with 113 and 131.
   
It can be expressed as a sum of consecutive primes in four different ways: as a sum of three consecutive primes (101 + 103 + 107), as a sum of five consecutive primes (53 + 59 + 61 + 67 + 71), as a sum of seven consecutive primes (31 + 37 + 41 + 43 + 47 + 53 + 59), and as a sum of eleven consecutive primes (11 + 13 + 17 + 19 + 23 + 29 + 31 + 37 + 41 + 43 + 47).
   
311 is a strictly non-palindromic number, as it is not palindromic in any base between base 2 and base 309.

311 is the smallest positive integer d such that the imaginary quadratic field Q() has class number = 19.

References

Integers